Diagnosis: Murder is an action comedy/mystery/medical crime drama television series starring Dick Van Dyke as Dr. Mark Sloan, a medical doctor who solves crimes with the help of his son, a homicide detective played by his real-life son Barry Van Dyke. The series began as a spin-off of Jake and the Fatman. The series originally aired from October 29, 1993, to May 11, 2001, and a total of 178 episodes aired.

In addition, a total of five Diagnosis: Murder television films were made, with the first three (Diagnosis of Murder, The House on Sycamore Street and A Twist of the Knife) being produced before the television series began. The final two movies (A Town Without Pity and Without Warning) were produced in 2002 after the television series had ended.

Series overview

Episodes

Pilot (1991) 

A backdoor pilot for Diagnosis: Murder aired as the 19th episode of the fourth season of Jake and the Fatman. ("No. overall" and "No. in season" for the pilot indicate the position of the episode within the collection of episodes of the originating series.)

Movies (1992–1993)

Season 1 (1993–1994)

Season 2 (1994–1995)

Season 3 (1995–1996)

Season 4 (1996–1997)

Season 5 (1997–1998)

Season 6 (1998–1999)

Season 7 (1999–2000)

Season 8 (2000–2001)

Movies (2002)

References

External links 
 

Lists of American crime drama television series episodes